Ku Ix was the fourth dynastic ruler Copan. Ku Ix built a new phase of Temple 26 at the city, over the Motmot phase, nicknamed Papagayo.

Notes

References

5th-century monarchs in North America
Rulers of Copán
476 deaths
Year of birth unknown
5th century in the Maya civilization